Newton Hall may refer to:

 Newton Hall, Bywell, a location, former civil parish and country house in Northumberland, England
 Newton Hall, Durham, a large housing estate in County Durham, England
 Newton Hall, Mobberley, a country house near Mobberley, Cheshire, England
 Newton Hall, Newton-by-the-Sea, an 18th-century country house in Newton-by-the-Sea, Northumberland, England
 Newton Hall, Northumberland, an 18th-century country house in Newton on the Moor, Northumberland, England
 Newton H. Hall (1842–1911), American infantryman in the Union Army